The group stage of the 2014 AFC Champions League was played from 25 February to 23 April 2014. A total of 32 teams competed in the group stage.

Draw
The draw for the group stage was held on 10 December 2013, 16:00 UTC+8, at the AFC House in Kuala Lumpur, Malaysia. The 32 teams were drawn into eight groups of four. Teams from the same association could not be drawn into the same group.

The following 32 teams (16 from West Zone, 16 from East Zone) were entered into the group-stage draw, which included the 28 automatic qualifiers and the four qualifying play-off winners, whose identity was not known at the time of the draw:

Format
In the group stage, each group was played on a home-and-away round-robin basis. The winners and runners-up of each group advanced to the round of 16.

Tiebreakers
The teams are ranked according to points (3 points for a win, 1 point for a draw, 0 points for a loss). If tied on points, tiebreakers are applied in the following order:
Greater number of points obtained in the group matches between the teams concerned
Goal difference resulting from the group matches between the teams concerned
Greater number of goals scored in the group matches between the teams concerned (away goals do not apply)
Goal difference in all the group matches
Greater number of goals scored in all the group matches
Penalty shoot-out if only two teams are involved and they are both on the field of play
Fewer score calculated according to the number of yellow and red cards received in the group matches (1 point for a single yellow card, 3 points for a red card as a consequence of two yellow cards, 3 points for a direct red card, 4 points for a yellow card followed by a direct red card)
Drawing of lots

Groups
The matchdays were 25–26 February, 11–12 March, 18–19 March, 1–2 April, 15–16 April, and 22–23 April 2014.

Group A

Group B

Group C

Group D

Tiebreakers
Al-Ahli and Sepahan are ranked on head-to-head record.

Group E

Group F

Tiebreakers
Beijing Guoan and Central Coast Mariners are tied on head-to-head record, and so are ranked by overall goal difference.

Group G

Tiebreakers
Jeonbuk Hyundai Motors and Melbourne Victory are tied on head-to-head record, and so are ranked by overall goal difference.

Group H

Tiebreakers
Western Sydney Wanderers and Kawasaki Frontale are tied on head-to-head record, and so are ranked by overall goal difference.

References

External links
AFC Champions League, the-AFC.com

2